Boomkatalog. One is the debut album by the brother-sister duo Boomkat, released in America on March 18, 2003 by DreamWorks Records. It features the singles "The Wreckoning" and "What U Do 2 Me".

Style and themes
Taryn and Kellin Manning have been part of the producing and writing of the album, and many of the song lyrics are very personal.

Critical reception

Boomkatalog.One received mixed reviews from music critics. On Metacritic, which assigns a normalized rating out of 100 to reviews from mainstream critics, the album received an average score of 54, based on 8 reviews.

Barry Walters of Rolling Stone was critical of the duo's talents, saying that Taryn was acting more than singing and Kellin was Americanizing trip hop with unnecessary production tricks, concluding that: "Despite their fakeness, Boomkat fill the smarter-than-your-average-pop void left by fellow film-music switch-hitter Vitamin C." DJ Ron Slomowicz of About.com felt that the album was hampered by false advertisement because of the subpar tracks ("Now Understand This" and "Wasting My Time") in the middle portion of the record but still found the rest of it enjoyable, saying that: "[A]t its best, Boomkatalog is an energetic fusion of hip-hop and jungle, but at its worst it is a mishmash of wannabe styles." Keith Caulfield of Billboard praised the duo's sound for being an amalgam of different genres and Taryn's voice for its resemblance of Nelly Furtado, Macy Gray and Melanie C, concluding that: "Adventurous music fans should flock to Boomkat, especially those that thirst for an alternative to the pop norm." Johnny Loftus of AllMusic found the processed supporting vocals and the tracks "Wasting My Time" and "What U Do 2 Me" as the album's weak spots but still praised it for Kellin's production work and Taryn's vocal delivery, calling it "a crazy/beautiful mix of irritating and endearing... with the clowning, pointed cynicism of a female Ad-Rock," saying that: "Boomkatalog.One is a clever marriage of technology, creativity, and straight-up sass that gets away with being much more enjoyable than it might deserve."

Track listing

Singles
"The Wreckoning"
"What U Do 2 Me"

Use in the media
"Wastin' My Time" was featured on the soundtrack of the film 8 Mile as well as in Smallville (Season 2).
"Crazylove" appeared in the soundtrack to the 2002 Britney Spears film Crossroads.
"The Wreckoning" can be heard in the movie The Italian Job and the TV series Birds of Prey.
 Boomkat performed "What U Do 2 Me" on the Nickelodeon show All That.
"Now Understand This" was performed by Taryn as Cara Glyn in a second season episode of Boston Public.

Charts
"Boomkatalog.one" by Boomkat has been listed for one week on the US Albums Top 100. It entered the chart on position 88 on week 17/2003, its last appearance was on week 17/2003. It peaked on number 88, where it stayed for a week. The album also peaked number 43 in New Zealand's album chart, as well as number 96 in Australian album chart.

References

2003 debut albums
Boomkat albums
DreamWorks Records albums